Robert M. Haverfield (October 26, 1918 – September 8, 1980) was an American judge and politician. He served as a Democratic member for the 13th and 41st district of the Florida Senate.

Life and career 
Haverfield was born in Cadiz, Ohio. He attended Ohio State University and the University of Miami.

In 1965, Haverfield was elected to represent the 13th district of the Florida Senate, serving until 1966. In 1967, he was elected to represent the 41st district, serving until 1972. In the same year, he was appointed by Governor Reubin Askew to serve as a judge for the Florida Third District Court of Appeal, serving until his death.

Haverfield died in September 1980 at his home in Coral Gables, Florida, at the age of 61.

References 

1918 births
1980 deaths
People from Cadiz, Ohio
Democratic Party Florida state senators
20th-century American politicians
Florida state court judges
20th-century American judges
Judges of the Florida District Courts of Appeal